A Uruguayan Argentine is an Argentine citizen of Uruguayan descent or a Uruguay-born person who resides in Argentina. As of 2012, there were over 116,000 Uruguayans living in Argentine territory.

Overview 
Current data put the figure of Uruguayans in Argentina at over 200,000.

Many Uruguayan-born persons live in Argentina, for various reasons. Both countries share the same language, culture and ethnicity and their populations bear striking similarities; the historical origins of both nations is common (part of the Viceroyalty of the River Plate, Spanish Empire); both countries are members of MERCOSUR, there is no need for special migration documents, and circulation is relatively easy. Argentina has a much bigger economy, which has always attracted Uruguayans in search of opportunities; the cultural scene is intense, so many talented Uruguayan actors and entertainers have succeeded in their artistic careers in Argentina. And last, but not least, Uruguayans value and praise Argentina as a nice tourist and holidaying destination; especially as a "shopping paradise".

Uruguayan residents in Argentina have their own institutions, for instance, the Consultative Council in Buenos Aires or the Center of Uruguayan Residents in Mar del Plata "José Gervasio Artigas".

History
The causes of Uruguayan immigration to Argentina are several. Among these, in addition to the 1973 Uruguayan coup d'état are: improved living conditions, job search, fleeing the economic, socio-cultural similarity with Argentina, among others. Most settled throughout the Argentine territory, but mainly in the City of Buenos Aires and the surrounding metropolitan area and the rest of the Buenos Aires Province.

A notable group of Uruguayan humorists developed their career on both countries, Argentina and Uruguay: Ricardo Espalter, Raimundo Soto, Eduardo D'Angelo, Julio Frade, Enrique Almada. During the 1960s, 1970s and 1980s they commuted frequently to record famous television comedies: Jaujarana, Hupumorpo, Comicolor, Híperhumor.

Notable Uruguayan Argentines and Argentines with Uruguayan ancestors

past
María Abella de Ramírez (1863–1926), feminist writer
Leonor Acevedo (1876-1975), mother and secretary of Jorge Luis Borges
Torcuato de Alvear (1822-1890), politician, son and father of Presidents of Argentina
Santiago Arrieta (1897-1975), actor
Luis César Avilés (1938-2019), journalist and television presenter
Enzo Bordabehere (1889-1935), lawyer and politician
Jorge Luis Borges (1899-1986), writer
Carlos Calvo (1824-1906), jurist and historian
Miguel Cané (1851-1905), writer, lawyer, academic, journalist, and politician
Manuel Campoamor (1877-1941), tango musician
Berugo Carámbula (1945-2015), comedian
Rubén W. Cavallotti (1924-1999), film director
Juana del Pino y Vera Mujica (1786-1841), First Lady of Argentina as wife of Bernardino Rivadavia
Horacio Ferrer (1933-2014), tango lyricist
Santiago Gómez Cou (1903-1984), actor
María Amalia Lacroze de Fortabat (1921-2012), businesswoman and philanthropist, related to Uruguayan president Manuel Oribe
Libertad Lamarque (1908-2000), actress and singer
Lorenzo Latorre (184-1916), military dictator, spent his last years exiled in Argentina
Irineo Leguisamo (1903-1985), jockey 
Tita Merello (1904-2002), tango singer and actress
Nina Miranda (1925-2012), tango singer and composer  
Enrique Loedel Palumbo (1901–1962), physicist
Ricardo López Jordán (1822–1889), soldier and politician
Hilarión de la Quintana (1774-1843), military officer and governor of Tucumán 
Horacio Quiroga (1878-1937), short story writer
Hermenegildo Sábat (1933-2018), caricaturist
Enrique Saborido (1877–1941), tango musician
Miguel Saiz (1949-2019), politician, governor of Río Negro Province
Carlos Sherman (1934-2005), translator and activist
Juan Manuel Tenuta (1924-2013), actor
Luisa Vehil (1912-1991), actress
Juan Verdaguer (1915-2001), humorist 
Emilio Vidal (1918-1994), actor and humorist 
Constancio C. Vigil (1876-1954), writer and publisher
Tincho Zabala (1923-2001), actor
Fabio Zerpa (1928-2019), ufologist
China Zorrilla (1923-2014), actress
present
Gabriela Acher, actress and comedian
Eunice Castro, model and television presenter
Mateo Chiarino, actor, writer, and director
Mónica Farro, vedette
Nicolás Furtado, actor
María Noel Genovese, model and actress
Andrea Ghidone, vedette
Ernesto Goñi, footballer
Daniel Hendler, actor
Osvaldo Laport, actor
Laura Malosetti Costa, essayist
Víctor Hugo Morales, journalist
Natalia Oreiro, actress
Henny Trayles, actress and comedian

See also

Argentina–Uruguay relations
Argentines in Uruguay
Emigration from Uruguay

References

Immigration to Argentina
 
Argentina